El Charco Airport  is an airport serving the Tapaje River town of El Charco in the Nariño Department of Colombia.

See also

Transport in Colombia
List of airports in Colombia

References

External links
OurAirports - El Charco
FallingRain - El Charco Airport
HERE/Nokia - El Charco

Airports in Colombia